Tony McGahan is an Australian rugby union coach who is currently an assistant coach at the Queensland Reds.

Early career
Born in Queensland, Australia, a teacher by profession, a BE in Physical Education from Queensland University of Technology, he played Rugby Union (inside centre) with Queensland Schoolboys and Eastern Districts and Rugby League with Queensland U16s/19s, Australian Universities.

Munster
In July 2008, McGahan took up the position as the director of coaching of Munster following Declan Kidney's departure to take over as Ireland coach. He had been involved with the Munster team since 2005 as the defence and backs coach.

In May 2011 he coached Munster to win the 2010–11 Celtic League Grand Final against Leinster at Thomond Park.

McGahan left Munster at the end of the 2011–12 season, to take up a role as Australian defence coach.

Australia
McGahan took up the role of coaching co-ordinator of Australia after leaving Munster at the end of the 2011–12 European domestic season.

He became coach of the Melbourne Rebels at the end of the  2013 Super Rugby season.

References

Living people
Munster Rugby non-playing staff
Australian rugby union coaches
Australian rugby union players
Australian rugby league players
Sportsmen from Queensland
Queensland University of Technology alumni
1972 births
Melbourne Rebels coaches